Guadalupe River may refer to:

United States
 Guadalupe River (California), a tributary of the San Francisco Bay
 Guadalupe River (Texas), a tributary of the San Antonio Bay of the Gulf of Mexico
 Guadalupe River State Park, a state park located on a section of the Guadalupe River in Kendall and Comal counties in Texas United States, northwest of Bulverde
 Rio Guadalupe (New Mexico), a tributary of the Jemez River

Other
 Guadalupe (Spain), a tributary of the Guadiana in southern Spain

See also
 Guadalope River, a tributary of the Ebro River in northern Spain